Mark Fell may refer to:
 Mark Fell (cricketer)
 Mark Fell (artist)